Charles Washington Misick  (born 13 March 1950) is a Turks and Caicos Islander politician who has been the 5th Premier of the Turks and Caicos Islands since 20 February 2021. He has been the leader of the Progressive National Party since 20 December 2016. He previously served as the 5th Chief Minister of the Turks and Caicos Islands from 3 April 1991 to 31 January 1995, was Minister of Finance, Trade and Investment from 2012 to 2016 and Leader of the Opposition from 1995 to 2003 and again from 2016 to 2021. Misick has been a Member of Parliament for the All Island District since November 2012 and was previously an MP for Grand Turk from 1991 to 1999.

Misick was educated at West Indies College and studied Business Studies and Business Administration & Accounting at University Technology.

Early life 
Misick was born on North Caicos on 13 March 1950 and grew up there with his 12 siblings. Misick is the older brother of former Premier, Michael Misick and the uncle of former Minister of Immigration, Donhue Gardiner.

2021 general elections

Leaving politics 
Since becoming the Leader of the Opposition in 2016, Misick was assuring everyone that he would be leaving politics after his term had come to an end. Thus, it was a surprise to all when he, in early 2019, stood for re-election within the party as its leader for the election to be called. Misick won said election and remained leader as the party geared up for what was expected to be the 2020 general elections. He still told of his readiness to exit politics in a ‘two minute speech’ in the House of Assembly on 4 March 2019 stating,“Over the past two years, I have been saying that I am done with this and I am leaving, but there comes a time for every man and nation to make a decision… I think I have a legacy that is not all bad and I believe it behoves me in a time like this to stand up, be counted and continue to contribute to these Islands even at my own detriment, my own personal economic loss.”

Landslide victory 

The PNP’s “All Aboard Ship PNP” campaign quickly gained momentum as they began campaigning for their 15 candidates well before the opposing party had even chosen its 15 candidates.

This would prove to pay off as the PNP went on to win 14 of the 15 electoral districts in the 2021 general elections. The only seat not won has historically always gone to the PDM.

Upon being sworn in, Misick (70) is the second oldest to lead the nation, with the oldest being Nathaniel Francis who was 73 years old when he was sworn in as Chief Minister in 1985.

Personal life
Misick was born in Bottle Creek, North Caicos to Charles and Jane Misick. He is married to Delthia Misick. He has numerous siblings, one being his younger brother, Michael Misick.

His employment history includes senior audit position with PriceWaterhouse-Coopers, Chairman and CEO of the Prestigious Group - Real Estate Sales and Development. In the past held the portfolio of Tourism and Finance.

Misick has attended and presented at many conferences in the Caribbean, Canada, the United States, and Asia on topics ranging from Financial Services to Investment Opportunities and Tourism.

He is a member of the Seventh-day Adventist Church.

In the 2000 New Year Honours, Misick was appointed Officer of the Order of the British Empire (OBE) for community service.

References

|-

1950 births
Living people
Chief Ministers of the Turks and Caicos Islands
Premiers of the Turks and Caicos Islands
Progressive National Party (Turks and Caicos Islands) politicians
Turks and Caicos Islands Christians
Officers of the Order of the British Empire